State Road 60 (SR 60) is an east–west route transversing Florida from the Gulf of Mexico to the Atlantic Ocean. The western terminus of SR 60 is at the Sunsets at Pier 60 site in Clearwater Beach. The eastern terminus is in Vero Beach near the Atlantic Coast just past State Road A1A.

Route description

SR 60 is primarily a four lane divided highway from its western terminus through the town of Lake Wales to County Road 630 near Indian Lake Estates; from there it is a two-lane road until reaching Florida's Turnpike at Yeehaw Junction. From there until its eastern terminus it is a divided highway.

In the Tampa Bay area it is the main route from Tampa to the Clearwater area beaches and from Tampa International Airport to northern Pinellas county. It also provides service from Tampa International Airport to the Suncoast Parkway. It is the main non-limited access route from downtown Tampa to Brandon, paralleling the Lee Roy Selmon Expressway.

SR 60 splits into two one-way streets in southern downtown Clearwater as of 2005. This is a result of the recent realignment of the SR 60 corridor in the area, following the completion of the new Memorial Causeway.

Local street names for SR 60

From west to east:
 Causeway Boulevard from the intersection with Gulfview Boulevard and Mandalay Avenue on Clearwater Beach to causeway.
 Memorial Causeway on causeway between Clearwater Beach and mainland Clearwater.
 SR 60 divides into Court Street (one-way westbound) and Chestnut Street (one-way eastbound) between Bay Ave and Ewing Ave.
 Court Street from Ewing Ave to S Highland Ave.
 Gulf-to-Bay Boulevard from S Highland Avenue to Tampa Bay.
 Courtney Campbell Causeway over Tampa Bay to Memorial Highway, the eastern terminus of Courtney Campbell Causeway, and the southern terminus of SR 589 in Tampa
 Memorial Highway from the eastern terminus of Courtney Campbell Causeway and southern terminus of SR 589 to junction I-275
 John F. Kennedy Boulevard from I-275 to Channelside Drive. (Cosigned with Business U.S. Highway 41 most of that section)
 Channelside Drive until junction Adamo Drive.
 Adamo Drive until junction with Interstate 75.
 Brandon Boulevard from I-75 until Mount Carmel Road.
 SR 60 to Plant City.
 Hopewell Road in Plant City, resumes SR 60 east of Plant City.
 Simply signed SR 60 from there until reaching Mulberry city limits.
 Canal Street in Mulberry, resumes SR 60 signage east of Mulberry.
 West Main Street west of Bartow city limits.
 SR 60 divides into SR 60A (Bypass 60) and Business SR 60 at Baker Street in Bartow
 Bypass 60 called Van Fleet Drive until rejoining business route. (cosigned with US 98 for part of that route)
 Business 60 continues Main Street signage until US 17 then Flamingo Drive until merger back to Bypass.
 From east of Bartow to Lake Wales is simply called SR 60. In Lake Wales it is called West Polk, although it changes to Hesperides Road in eastern Lake Wales and east of the city.
 Simply signed SR 60 until Interstate 95.
 20th Street in Vero Beach from Interstate 95 to 20th Avenue.
 19th Place (one-way eastbound) and 20th Street (one-way westbound) in Vero Beach from east of 20th Avenue until Commerce Avenue.
 20th Street (one-way eastbound) and 20th Place (one-way westbound) in Vero Beach from east of Commerce Avenue to west of 6th Avenue.
 20th Street from west of 6th Avenue in Vero Beach to Indian River Blvd.
 Cosigned with Indian River Blvd until Merrill P. Barber Bridge.
 Merrill P. Barber Bridge over the Indian River.
 Beachland Boulevard after bridge until eastern terminus at State Road A1A.
 Stan Mayfield Memorial Highway from the Florida Turnpike to I-95.
 Richard Raczkoski Memorial Highway from I-95 to 43rd Avenue.

History

Clearwater realignment
Originally, SR 60 in Clearwater traveled west of Highland Avenue along Gulf-to-Bay Boulevard  and Cleveland Street to the Memorial Causeway. When construction of the new Memorial Causeway began in 2001/2002, SR 60 was realigned along Court Street and Pierce Boulevard to the Causeway, with the original alignment downloaded to the city of Clearwater. Between Martin Luther King Jr. Boulevard and Pierce, SR 60 is split into two one-way streets—Court Street carrying westbound traffic, and Chestnut Street carrying eastbound traffic.

Prior to the realignment, Court Street east of Missouri Avenue was known as SR 651, while Court and Chestnut Streets west of Missouri was a locally maintained road signed as "Bypass 60".

Major intersections

State Road 60A

State Road 60A served as a bypass for Bartow, Florida, until SR 60 was realigned to follow that route in 2006.  It is briefly cosigned with US 98 during its route. It is mainly known as Van Fleet Drive.

See also
Conners Highway

References

External links

Florida 60 (SouthEastRoads.com)

State highways in Florida
State Roads in Pinellas County, Florida
State Roads in Hillsborough County, Florida
State Roads in Tampa, Florida
State Roads in Polk County, Florida
State Roads in Osceola County, Florida
State Roads in Indian River County, Florida
State Roads in Vero Beach, Florida
1945 establishments in Florida